Subhan Rahim oglu Jabrayilov was an Azerbaijani military officer, non-commissioned officer
serving in the Azerbaijani Armed Forces. He had taken part in the 2020 Nagorno-Karabakh war, in which he was killed. He had received the title of the Hero of the Patriotic War for his service during the war.

Early life 
Subhan Rahim oglu Jabrayilov was born on 23 October 1983, in Salyan District of the Azerbaijan SSR, which was then part of the Soviet Union.

Military service 
Subhan Jabrayilov started his military career in 2002. He was a non-commissioned officer serving in the Land Forces of the Azerbaijani Armed Forces.

Subhan Jabrayilov fought for the freedom of Fuzuli, Zangilan and Gubadli during the 2020 Nagorno-Karabakh war which started on 27 September.

He was killed on 19 October in the battles for Gubadly.

Awards 
 Jabrayilov was awarded the title of the Hero of the Patriotic War on 9 December 2020, by the decree of the President Aliyev.
 Jabrayilov was awarded the "For Fatherland" Medal on 9 December 2020, by the decree of the President Aliyev.
 Jabrayilov was awarded the For the Liberation of Jabrayil Medal on 24 December 2020, by the decree of the President Aliyev.

See also 
 Anar Aliyev

References 

1983 births
2020 deaths
Heroes of the Patriotic War
People killed in the 2020 Nagorno-Karabakh war
Azerbaijani Land Forces personnel of the 2020 Nagorno-Karabakh war
People from Salyan District (Azerbaijan)